A  is an itinerant Japanese Buddhist ascetic; see Buddhism in Japan. The term may also be used for an Emperor of Japan.

Hijiri may also refer to:

Locations
 , Akaishi Mountains, Honshu, Japan
 Hijiri Highlands, Omi, Nagano, Hokkaido, Japan
 Hijiri-Kōgen Station, is a train station
 , an aviation museum in Omi, Nagano, Hokkaido, Japan
 Hijiri zaka, a hill road in Minato, Tokyo, Japan
Fictional locations
 Hijiri Gakuen, the fictional setting of Tenshi Nanka Ja Nai

People
Surname
 Chiaki Hijri, a Japanese mangaka and author of Seigi no Mikata
 John Hijiri, a Japanese film director; see the 2009 film Jaws in Japan
 Yuki Hijiri, a Japanese mangaka and author of Locke the Superman
Given name
 , Japanese soccer player
 , Japanese musician
 , Japanese soccer player

Fictional characters
Surname
 , a character from Aa! Megami-sama! (Oh My Goddess!)
 , a character from Basara (manga)
 , a character from Ultraman Trigger: New Generation Tiga
 , a character from Undefined Fantastic Object
 , a character from Bari Bari Densetsu
 Jyoji Hijiri, a character from Shin Megami Tensei III: Nocturne
 , a character from Puella Magi Madoka Magica
 , a character from Swan (manga)
Given name
 , a character from Pretty Rhythm: Rainbow Live
 , a character from Twinkle Stars
 , a character from Girls Bravo
 , a character from Trinity Seven
 , a character from Ratman (manga)
 , a character from Bakuon!!
 , a character from Scared Rider Xechs
 , a character from Kageki Shojo!!
 , a character from FLCL

Other uses
Koya Hijiri, Japanese monks who practiced Buddhism

See also

 
 

Japanese masculine given names
Japanese-language surnames